was a railway station on the Kashima Railway Line in Hokota, Ibaraki, Japan, operated by the Kashima Railway operator Kashima Railway. And, now, this station is used as a bus terminal by Kantetsu Green Bus.

In 2000, the station was selected as「関東の駅百選」by Ministry of Transport (Japan)（Ministry of Land, Infrastructure, Transport and Tourism）. But the station was abolished in 2007 because of abolition of Kashima Railway, and at present there is a platform which was used on the station.

Since the station was discontinued, a bus terminal which was located in front of the station has been used by Kantetsu Green Bus. But, the bus terminal has called Hokota Station since Kashima Railway 
was open to traffic.

Outline
This station was a ground station. And, decorated a triangle of objet d'art on the roof. There were a stand-up soba noodle shop and a sold fish-shaped pancale filled with sweet bean paste shop that were operated by Kashima Railway.

As the station was selected「関東の駅100選」, there was a plan of keeping the station building, but the station building was demolished since the station building was a rather decrepit old facility. Volunteers have established "鉾田駅保存会" since 1 February 2008 and they tenanted the former site of the station and have purchased two vehicles of Kashima Railway from Kanto Railway. So, they operated and showed the vehicles once a month. But, they expired with Kanto Railway, so they moved the vehicles from this station to Hotpark Hokota（a facility for bathing） in 2009. And, they have donated the vehicles to Hokota, Ibaraki, but the vehicles have been maintained.
A shop for sold fish-shaped pancale filled with sweet bean paste had been moved to the bus terminal. But, in 2011, the platform has been damaged due to Great East Japan Earthquake and the platform wasn't repaired, and the shop was closed and removed on August in the year.

Surrounding area

Shin-Hokota Station
Kantetsu Green Bus Hokota office

Buses
There is a bus terminal.

History
16 May 1929 - This station was opened as a station of 鹿島参宮鉄道-Kashima Sangū Railway
1 April 1939 - This station moved the station to urban area where was presently place.
1 June 1965  - 鹿島参宮鉄道-Kashima Sangū Railway  常総筑波鉄道-Jōsō Tsukuba Railway was merged into the former Kanto Railway。
1979 ‐ This station had belonged to Kashima Railway Line because Kanto Railway Hokota Line was split into Kashima Railway。
2000 - This station was selected as「関東の駅百選」
2007 - Abolition

Adjacent stations

References

External links

 The meeting of preserving Kashitetsu
 Guide

Railway stations in Japan opened in 1929
Railway stations in Ibaraki Prefecture
Kashima Railway Line
Railway stations closed in 2007